McIlwraith is a rural locality in the Bundaberg Region, Queensland, Australia.

History
The locality was named after the former railway station, which in turn was named after former Premier of Queensland Thomas McIlwraith.

McIlwraith State School opened on 30 October 1934.

In the  McIlwraith had a population of 327.

Education 
McIlwraith State School is a government primary (Prep-6) school for boys and girls at 322 McIlwraith Road. In 2017, the school had an enrolment of 21 students with  2 teachers and 5 non-teaching staff (2 full-time equivalent).

There is no secondary school in McIlwraith; the nearest secondary school in neighbouring Gin Gin.

References

Localities in Queensland
Bundaberg Region